La Fortaleza (lit., "The Fortress" ) is the official residence of the governor of Puerto Rico. It was built between 1533 and 1540 to defend the harbor of San Juan. The structure is also known as Palacio de Santa Catalina (Saint Catherine's Palace). It is the oldest executive mansion in continuous use in the New World. It was listed by UNESCO in 1983 as part of the World Heritage Site "La Fortaleza and San Juan National Historic Site".

During the 1640 reconstruction, the chapel of Santa Catalina, which originally stood outside the walls, was integrated into the structure's walls, resulting in the alternate name Santa Catalina's Castle.

The structure

La Fortaleza was the first defensive fortification built for the city of San Juan and the first of a series of military structures built to protect the city, which included the Fort San Felipe del Morro and the Fort San Cristóbal. The construction was authorized by Charles V, Holy Roman Emperor as a defense against attacks from Island Caribs and the European powers of the time.

Initially, the structure consisted of four walls enclosing an interior patio with a circular tower known as the Homage Tower. From the top of the tower, following military tradition, the governor would take fidelity oaths at critical moments to the King and Queen of Spain. Later, a second tower named the Austral Tower was constructed.

The complex currently consists of a few attached buildings with formal living quarters on the second floor and private quarters on the third. It overlooks the high city walls that front the bay, and within the north perimeter of the house are sheltered gardens and a swimming pool.

History

Starting in 1529, Governor La Gama petitioned the emperor on the need to build defensive fortifications "because the island's defenseless condition caused the people to emigrate."  Construction started in 1533, using stone, and concluded by 1540.  Yet the fort had no guns, and Gonzalo Fernández de Oviedo y Valdés commented, "if it had been constructed by blind men could not have been located in a worse location."  Yet the structure has served as the governor's residence since 1544.

Since the 16th century, La Fortaleza has acted as the residence of the Governor of Puerto Rico, making it the oldest executive mansion in continuous use in the Americas. On November 27, 1822, its traditional status as the executive mansion was made official. The fortress underwent a massive reconstruction in 1846 to change its military appearance into a palatial facade.

La Fortaleza has been captured twice by invaders:

 1598, George Clifford, Earl of Cumberland, attacked San Juan.
 In 1625, General Boudewijn Hendrick (Balduino Enrico) of the Netherlands invaded the city and established himself at La Fortaleza. During the Dutch retreat, the fortress and the city were set ablaze.

In 1834, Colonel George Dawson Flinter described the fortress of Santa Catalina as having a chapel, stables, cistern, and an east wing with spacious apartments.

According to tradition, in 1898, just before the United States invaded Puerto Rico during the Spanish–American War, the last Spanish governor of the island, Ricardo De Ortega, struck a longcase clock in La Fortaleza with his sword, stopping the clock and marking the time at which Spain lost control over Puerto Rico.

On October 30, 1950, there was an attempt by a few nationalists to enter La Fortaleza in what is known as the San Juan Nationalist revolt, intending to attack then-governor Luis Muñoz Marín. The 5-minute shootout resulted in four Nationalists dead: Domingo Hiraldo Resto, Carlos Hiraldo Resto, Manuel Torres Medina, and Raímundo Díaz Pacheco. Three of the guards of the building, among them Lorenzo Ramos, were seriously injured.

On October 9, 1960, La Fortaleza was designated a United States National Historic Landmark.

In 1983, La Fortaleza, along with the San Juan National Historic Site, was declared a World Heritage Site by UNESCO.

In literature
In 2011, Puerto Rican author Giannina Braschi wrote the dramatic novel United States of Banana, featuring climactic scenes of revolution at La Fortaleza.

See also
 List of United States National Historic Landmarks in United States commonwealths and territories, associated states, and foreign states
 National Register of Historic Places listings in metropolitan San Juan, Puerto Rico
List of the oldest buildings in Puerto Rico

References

Further reading
 Government of Puerto Rico. Executive Mansion: Santa Catalina's Palace. San Juan, Puerto Rico. 
 World Heritage Committee. Report of 7th Session, Florence 1983. Paris:  UNESCO's Convention Concerning the Protection of the World Cultural and Natural Heritage. January 1984.

External links

 Government of Puerto Rico - Executive Mansion: Santa Catalina's Palace 
 UNESCO - World Heritage Center: La Fortaleza Historic Site Information
 Visiting information
 

Official residences in Puerto Rico
La Fortaleza and San Juan National Historic Site in Puerto Rico
Historic house museums in Puerto Rico
Houses on the National Register of Historic Places in Puerto Rico
Government buildings on the National Register of Historic Places in Puerto Rico
National Register of Historic Places in San Juan, Puerto Rico
National Historic Landmarks in Puerto Rico
Houses completed in 1540
Historic American Buildings Survey in Puerto Rico
Forts in Puerto Rico
1540 establishments in New Spain
1540s establishments in the Spanish West Indies
16th-century establishments in Puerto Rico